Elyse Morgan Bennett (born December 27, 1999) is an American professional soccer player who plays as a forward and midfielder for OL Reign in the National Women's Soccer League (NWSL).

Youth career
Born in Lake Forest, Illinois, Bennett was raised in the Green Bay, Wisconsin area and played several youth sports through middle school before taking up soccer in high school.

She played one season for De Pere High School in De Pere, Wisconsin before joining the FC Wisconsin Eclipse youth program, where she became a top scorer in the Elite Clubs National League for the 2015–16 season.

Bennett suffered an anterior cruciate ligament injury during her senior year of high school.

College career
Bennett graduated from high school early and enrolled in Washington State University as an early recruit to its women's soccer team.

After playing as a substitute and starter in her freshman season, Bennett became a regular starter at forward in her sophomore season before suffering a second ACL injury. She returned to start 23 of 24 matches in her junior year, 12 matches in the COVID-19-shortened 2020–21 spring season, and 21 matches in her fifth year in 2021.

Her fifth season featured career highs in goals (10), points (24), shots (93), shots on goal (37), and minutes played (1,557), and she was named to the All-Pac-12 first team and United Soccer Coaches All-American second team. Bennett was also the second Washington State player to play in more than 90 career matches, finishing with a second-most tally of 93 appearances.

Club career
The Kansas City Current selected Bennett with the club's first pick, the seventh overall pick of the 2022 NWSL Draft.

During the 2022 NWSL Challenge Cup, Bennett recorded four assists in her first six professional matches, including a two-assist match against the Chicago Red Stars that earned her an NWSL Player of the Week award.

Personal life

Bennett is the daughter of National Football League coach and former player Edgar Bennett. She has one older brother, Edgar IV. Bennett credited advice from her father, who recovered from ACL injuries during his professional football career, with aiding her recovery from her own.

References

External links
 
 
 Washington State Cougars profile
 Kansas City Current profile

1999 births
Living people
American women's soccer players
National Women's Soccer League players
Washington State Cougars women's soccer players
North Carolina Courage draft picks
People from Lake County, Illinois
Soccer players from Illinois
Women's association football forwards
Women's association football midfielders
Kansas City Current players
Soccer players from Wisconsin
Kansas City Current draft picks